Persatuan Sepakbola Indonesia Batang, commonly known as Persibat Batang, is an Indonesian football club based in Batang Regency, Central Java, Indonesia. They currently compete in the Liga 3.

Players

Current squad

Former players
  Roberto Kwateh (2005)
  Ferdinand Sinaga (2007)
  Budiman Yunus (2006–2008)
  Morris Bayour Power (2007–2008)
  Lamarana Diallo (2008)
  Indra Gunawan (2008–2009)
  Imran Usman (2014)
  Syaeful Anwar (2016–2017)
  Mochammad Sabillah (2017)
  Rosad Setiawan (2017)
  Busari (2018)
  Hapidin (2018)
  Rendy Saputra (2018)

Kit suppliers
 Vilour (2014)
 MBB (2015-2016)
 DJ Sport (2017)
 RIORS (2018)
 Maknorukun (2019-2020)
 Panguripan Sport Apparel (2021-present)

Supporter
 ROBAN MANIA
 Brigatta Ultras Roban
 Roban Rewo Rewo (R3)

Honours
Liga Indonesia First Division
Runners-up (1): 2014

References

External links
 

 
Football clubs in Indonesia
Football clubs in Central Java
Association football clubs established in 1974
1974 establishments in Indonesia